Orestes is a town in Monroe Township, Madison County, Indiana, United States. It is part of the Anderson, Indiana Metropolitan Statistical Area. The population was 414 at the 2010 census.

History
Orestes was founded in 1876 when the railroad was extended to that point. It may be named after Orestes in Greek mythology. Orestes was incorporated as a town in 1894.
Orestes was a little village known as Lowrys Switch until the town board decided to change the name and ask for suggestions for the name. Nathan McMahan sent in his son's name and upon its acceptance, the town became known as Orestes. Orestes McMahan was born on Christmas Day, 1876 and died September 14, 1946.  He was a farmer all his life and never married.

Geography

Demographics

2010 census
As of the census of 2010, there were 414 people, 148 households, and 114 families living in the town. The racial makeup of the town was 95.7% White, 0.2% African American, 0.5% Native American, 2.9% from other races, and 0.7% from two or more races. Hispanic or Latino of any race were 4.8% of the population.

There were 148 households, of which 38.5% had children under the age of 18 living with them;60.1% were married couples living together; 12.2% had a female householder with no husband present; 4.7% had a male householder with no wife present;and 23.0% were non-families. 18.9% of all households were made up of individuals, and 10.8% had someone living alone who was 65 years of age or older. The average household size was 2.80 and the average family size was 3.11.

The median age in the town was 35.8 years. 24.6% of residents were under the age of 18; 11.8% were between the ages of 18 and 24; 24.6% were from 25 to 44; 25.6% were from 45 to 64; and 13.3% were 65 years of age or older. The gender makeup of the town was 51.4% male and 48.6% female.

2000 census
As of the census of 2000, there were 334 people, 129 households, and 94 families living in the town. The racial makeup of the town was 97.31% White, 0.30% African American, 0.30% Asian, 1.50% from other races, and 0.60% from two or more races. Hispanic or Latino of any race were 3.29% of the population.

There were 129 households, out of which 31.8% had children under the age of 18 living with them, 54.3% were married couples living together, 7.0% had a female householder with no husband present, and 27.1% were non-families. 22.5% of all households were made up of individuals, and 11.6% had someone living alone who was 65 years of age or older. The average household size was 2.59 and the average family size was 2.91.

In the town, the population was spread out, with 25.1% under the age of 18, 11.7% from 18 to 24, 29.9% from 25 to 44, 19.8% from 45 to 64, and 13.5% who were 65 years of age or older. The median age was 34 years. For every 100 females, there were 111.4 males. For every 100 females age 18 and over, there were 103.3 males.

The median income for a household in the town was $39,219, and the median income for a family was $39,602. Males had a median income of $30,750 versus $21,250 for females. The per capita income for the town was $18,037. None of the families and 3.8% of the population were living below the poverty line, including no under eighteens and 11.8% of those over 64.

Flag 
The current flag of the Town of Orestes was designed by Orestes's own Carolyn Shettle which was accepted by the Town Board in 1976. The flag consists of three white rings on a blue background with a red flame amidst the rings. The symbolism of the flag and its rings, according to Mrs. Shettle is as follows:

 The image of a ring itself stands for continuity. There is no beginning and no ending. It stands for the past, present, and future of the Town of Orestes. The rings also are in the form of the letter "o" which stands for Orestes.
 The three different rings have their own individual meanings:
 One symbolizes our Delaware American-Indian Heritage.
 One stands for the Gas Boom from which the Town of Orestes was created.
 One represents the more than 300-year-old Orestes Oak Tree, which is a point of pride in the town.
 The flame stands for the Torch of Liberty and also symbolizes the discovery of gas which was the impetus for the creation of the Town of Orestes.
 The colors of the Flag are red, white, and blue to represent freedom, which the Citizens of Orestes hold dear, but the blue is brighter than normal to overemphasize their love of independence.

Unintentionally, Mrs. Shettle noted that a descending dove, in blue, can be seen in the flame which is a symbol of peace and Christianity.

Business

References

Towns in Madison County, Indiana
Towns in Indiana